The triathlon competition at the 2017 Southeast Asian Games was held at Putrajaya Lake. This competition follows the Olympic triathlon distance: a 1.5 km swim, a 40 km cycle, and a 10 km run.

Medalists

Medal table

References

External links
  

2017 in triathlon
2017 Southeast Asian Games events
Triathlon at the Southeast Asian Games